The 2012–13 Southern Utah Thunderbirds basketball team represented Southern Utah University during the 2012–13 NCAA Division I men's basketball season. The Thunderbirds were led by first year head coach Nick Robinson and played their home games at the Centrum Arena. They were members of the Big Sky Conference. They finished the season 11–20, 8–12 in Big Sky play to finish in a three way tie for sixth place. They lost in the quarterfinals of the Big Sky tournament to North Dakota.

Roster

Schedule

|-
!colspan=9| Regular season

|-
!colspan=9| 2013 Big Sky Conference men's basketball tournament

References

Southern Utah Thunderbirds men's basketball seasons
Southern Utah
2012 in sports in Utah
2013 in sports in Utah